Männer vor der Ehe ("Men Before Marriage") is a 1927 German silent film directed by Constantin J. David and starring Nina Vanna, Kurt Vespermann and Julius Falkenstein.

Cast
 Charles Lincoln as Der reiche Junggeselle  
 Kurt Vespermann as Der arme Junggeselle  
 Julius Falkenstein as Der unerschütterliche Junggeselle  
 Anton Pointner as Der leichtsinniger Junggeselle  
 Carl Auen as Der glückliche Ehemann  
 Dina Diercks as Die glücklicher Ehefrau  
 Nina Vanna as Das junge Mädchen  
 Käthe von Nagy as Der Backfisch  
 Hanni Weisse as Die 'Freundin'  
 Hilde Maroff as Das Mädchen, das nicht 'nein' sagen kann  
 Eva Held as Die Sekretärin mit den schönen Beinen  
 Grete Schmidt as Die 'filia hospitalis' 
 Valeska Stock as Ihre Mutter, Vermieterin

References

Bibliography
 Bock, Hans-Michael & Bergfelder, Tim. The Concise CineGraph. Encyclopedia of German Cinema. Berghahn Books, 2009.

External links

1927 films
Films of the Weimar Republic
Films directed by Constantin J. David
German silent feature films
German black-and-white films